Sura Academy was a Jewish yeshiva located in Sura in what is now southern Iraq, a region known in Jewish texts as "Babylonia". With Pumbedita Academy, it was one of the two major Jewish academies from the year 225 CE at the beginning of the era of the Amora sages until 1033 CE at the end of the era of the Gaonim. Sura Academy was founded by the Amora Abba Arikha ("Rav"), a disciple of Judah ha-Nasi. Among the well-known sages that headed the yeshiva were Rav Huna, Rav Chisda, Rav Ashi, Yehudai ben Nahman, Natronai ben Hilai, Saadia Gaon, and others.

History

Abba Arikha arrived at Sura city to find no lively Jewish religious public life, and since he was worried about the continuity of the Jewish community in Babylonia, he left his colleague Samuel of Nehardea and began working to establish the yeshiva that would become Sura Academy. Upon Abba Arikha's arrival, teachers from surrounding cities and towns descended upon Sura. The Academy of Sura was formally founded in the year 225 CE, several years after his arrival. 

Sura Academy would eventually grow to include a faculty of 1200 members and included the following features:

ˀekhseḏrā, a covered walkway leading from the street up to the house of learning
qṭon, offices for the rabbis and deans and classrooms for teachers
gannǝtā, garden whose produce fed the academy's teachers and students
ṣeppē, flat mats placed on the floor, where teachers and students could rest between classes 

Sura Academy soon became the most influential yeshiva in its region, besting the Nehardea Academy.

The academy's classes were occasionally held at Matha-Mehasia, a suburb of Sura city, and after a while a Torah center was founded there as well.

List of Sura academy's Deans

Amora era
Abba Arikha ("Rav") (founder of the academy)
Rav Huna (Rosh yeshiva, after Rav, for about 40 years)
Rav Chisda
Rav Ashi
Maremar
Idi b. Abin Naggara
Nachman bar Huna
Mar bar Rav Ashi (Tabyomi)
Rabbah Tosafa'ah
Ravina II

Savora era
Rav Ena

Gaonim era

Mar ben R. Huna – 591
R. Hanina (Hananiah, Hinenai) – around 610
Rav Hunai (Huna) – around 650
Rav Sheshna (Sheshua, Mesharsheya b. Tahlifa) – around 670
Hanina of Nehar Pekkod (Hananiah, Hinenai, Ha-Kohen, of Nhr [River] Paqod) – 689-694
Hillai of Naresh (Nehilai, Ha-Levi) – 694–712
Jacob of Nehar Pekod (Ha-Kohen, Nhr Paqod) – 712–730
Rav Samuel Gaon (of Pumbedita) (Rabba's grandson, descendant of Amemar) – 730–748
Mari ha-Kohen of Nehar Pekod (Nahr Paqod) – 748–756
Rav Aha Gaon – 756
Yehudai ben Nahman (Yehudai Gaon, Judah) (Author of Halakhot Pessoukot) – 757–761
Ahhunai Kahana ben Papa (Ahunai, Huna, ha-Kohen) – 761–769
Haninai Kahana ben R. Huna (Hanina, ha-Kohen, Ahunai) – 769–774
Mari ha-Levi ben R. Mesharsheya – 774–778
Bebai ha-Levi ben R. Abba of Nehar Pekod (Biboi, Nahr Paqod) – 778–789
Hilai ben R. Mari (Hillai) – 789–798
Jacob ha-Kohen ben Mordecai (Mordechai) – 798
Rav Abimai (Abumai, Ikhomai, ha-Kohen) (brother of R. Mordecai) – 815
Zadok ben R. Ashi (Issac Sadoq, ben Jesse) – 810–812
Hilai ben R. Hananiah (Hillai) – 812–816
Kimoi ben R. Ashi (Qimoi) – 816–820
Mesharsheya Kahana ben Jacob Gaon (Moses, ha-Kohen) – 820–830
Two years of an absence of a Gaon (843–844)
Kohen Tzedek ben Abimai Gaon (Sedeq, Ikhomai, Abumai) – 832–843
Sar Shalom ben Boaz – 843–853
Natronai ben R. Hilai ben R. Mari Gaon (Natronai ben Hilai) – 853–861
Amram bar Sheshna (Amram Gaon, Amram ben R. Sheshna) (Author of the Siddur) – 861–872
Nahshon ben R. Zadok – 872–879
Zemah ben R. Hayyim – (Semah) 879–886
Rav Malka – 886
Hai ben R. Nahshon ben Tzadok (ben Issac Sadoq) – 886–896
Hilai ben Natronai ben Hilai Gaon (Hillai, Natrunai) – 896–904
Shalom ben R. Mishael – 904
Jacob ben R. Natronai (ha-Kohen, Natrunai) – 911–924
Yom-Tob Kahana ben R. Jacob (Yom Tov, ha-Kohen) – 924
Saadia ben Joseph of Faym (Al-Fayyumi, Saadia Gaon) – 928–942
Joseph ben Jacob bar Satya (ben Satya) – around 930
The academy was closed for about 45 years
Zemah Tzedek ben Paltoi ben Isaac (Semah, Sedeq) – around 990 and around 998
Samuel ben Hofni (Hophni, ha-Kohen) (father-in-law of Hai Gaon) – around 998 and around 1012
Dosa ben Saadia Gaon (Son of Saadia Gaon) – 1012–1018
Israel ha-Kohen ben Samuel ben Hofni (Hophni) – 1018–1033

Sources:

See also
 History of the Jews in Iraq
 Talmudic Academies in Babylonia
 Feroz Shapur, now Anbar, a town adjacent or identical to Nehardea; academy of Pumbedita was moved to this town for half of the 6th century
 Mahuza, now al-Mada'in; the academy of Pumbedita was relocated to Mahuza during the time of Rava Amora 
 Nehardea Academy (in Nehardea)
 Pumbedita Academy (in Pumbedita for most of its history, near modern-day Fallujah)
 Pum-Nahara Academy
 Sura (city) – the political centre of Jewish Babylonia after Nehardea
 Talmudic Academies in Syria Palaestina (in the Land of Israel)

References

Talmudic Academies in Babylonia
Religious academies in Babylon
Jewish Babylonian history
Jewish education
Jewish educational organizations
Talmud
Chazal